Kaine Sheppard (born 26 November 1993) is an English professional footballer who plays as a forward for Heidelberg United.

Career
On 19 July 2017, Sheppard signed for Finnish Veikkausliiga club SJK until the end of the 2017 season, with an option for the 2018 season.

After scoring 14 goals in 22 league games for Avondale, Sheppard joined A-League side Newcastle Jets on a one-year deal.

In February 2021, Sheppard joined Western United for the remainder of the 2020–21 A-League season.

In February 2022, Sheppard rejoined Heidelberg United for the season.

Personal life
Sheppard holds Australian citizenship.

References

External links

Kaine Sheppard at Avondale FC

1993 births
Living people
Association football forwards
English footballers
Expatriate footballers in Finland
English expatriate sportspeople in Finland
English expatriate footballers
English expatriate sportspeople in Australia
St Albans City F.C. players
Histon F.C. players
Braintree Town F.C. players
Heidelberg United FC players
Avondale FC players
Newcastle Jets FC players
Western United FC players